The Sentinel is an action crime drama series that aired on UPN in the United States from March 20, 1996 to May 24, 1999. It premiered on March 20, 1996, and ran for 65 episodes over four seasons. The series later re-aired on Syfy.

Plot overview

Jim Ellison was a US Army Ranger who spent 18 months in the Peruvian jungle after the rest of his unit was killed. He developed hyperacute senses from surviving in the wild, but repressed them when he returned to civilization. His sensory abilities re-manifested five years later, while conducting an extended stakeout in the forest as a detective in the Major Crimes Unit of the Cascade, Washington, police department. He went to a hospital for an examination where he met Blair Sandburg, an anthropologist from Rainier University, whom Ellison initially mistook for a physician. Upon hearing Ellison's story, Sandburg declares that Ellison is a "Sentinel": in ancient tribes, Sentinels used their enhanced senses to protect their village. For Jim, Cascade is his village. Blair had been studying Sentinel mythology for years. While he found many individuals with one or two hyperactive senses, he had never before found a person with all five senses enhanced, a "true" Sentinel.

Blair helps Jim control his senses and joins Jim as a police observer. Their unlikely partnership works, and together they fight crime in the streets of Cascade. The only person aside from Sandburg who knows Jim's secret is his captain and friend, Simon Banks.

Pilot
Jim doesn't believe Blair's explanation about his senses at first. In fact, at their second meeting, Jim throws Blair up against a wall and calls him a "neo-hippie, witch-doctor punk." Nevertheless, Jim's senses are a huge problem, as demonstrated when Blair has to shove Jim and himself under an oncoming garbage truck to save Jim from a zone-out. Jim later introduces Blair to Simon Banks, the chief of Major Crimes, and gets Blair a ninety-day observer's pass so that Blair can help with his senses. The excuse they give is that Blair is Jim's kid cousin, whom he is helping get his doctorate by allowing him to study the police force so he can write a dissertation on the "thin blue line" and the closed society of the police force.

Soon after, Blair's warehouse apartment is blown up by the drug lab next door, and Jim invites Blair to stay with him at his loft apartment at 852 Prospect Ave., apartment 307. Blair temporarily brings with him Larry the Ape, the subject of a short-term sociology study. Although the arrangement is only meant to last a week, Blair stays for years.

Seasons 1–3
On the job, Jim constantly reminds his wayward "partner" to stay in the truck, although Blair rarely listens. Also, Blair is often the victim of kidnapping and abuse by various criminals. Blair also steadily serves to complete Jim's paperwork and soothe Jim's temper. The other detectives at Major Crimes think of him fondly, and Blair has many nicknames: "Chief" from Jim, "Hairboy" from Rafe and Henri, and "Sandy" from Megan Connor.

Season 4
At the end of season three, Blair meets a new sentinel, Ms Alex Barnes (Jeri Ryan), and agrees to help her with her senses. Jim has a "nightmare" (actually a vision) about killing Blair, and is haunted by apparent hallucinations (actually more visions) of Barnes' spirit animal, a spotted panther. However, at this point Blair has not told Jim there's a new Sentinel in town, and Jim is confused over the Sentinel instincts he's experiencing. Unsure of what is going on, Jim throws Blair out of the loft. Alex attacks Blair and kills him. After Blair has been pronounced dead, Jim uses the power of his animal spirit to bring Blair back from the dead. However, he's still haunted by spirit visions of Alex and is unable to control a strange attraction to her, leading to a kiss between them in front of Blair. Jim manages to regain control over his Sentinel urges. Alex, now rendered catatonic after experimenting with a drug meant to increase her sentinel abilities, is confined to a mental institution, and Blair returns to the loft.

The last episode of the series, "'The Sentinel' by Blair Sandburg", shows Blair finally finishing his dissertation. He's promised to allow Jim to read the paper before he turns it in but unfortunately, his mother shows up at the loft, snoops on his computer, and e-mails the document to Sid Graham, a big-shot publisher in New York. Sid releases snippets of Blair's Sentinel paper to the press and the general public, who then hound Jim and Blair. To repair his relationship with his friend and fix his wrongdoing, Blair rejects a three-million-dollar publishing contract at a press conference where he declares his dissertation fraudulent, thus destroying his academic career. At the end of this last episode, Jim and Simon offer Blair a place in Major Crimes as a police officer should he choose to accept it.

Cast

Main
 Richard Burgi as Detective Jim Ellison
 Garett Maggart as Blair Sandburg
 Bruce A. Young as Captain Simon Banks
 Kelly Curtis as Lieutenant Carolyn Plummer (season 1)

Recurring
 Anna Galvin as Megan Connor
 Ken Earl as Bomb Squad Captain Joel Taggert
 Henri Brown as Detective Brown
 Ryf Van Rij as Detective Rafe

Characters

Jim Ellison
Jim Ellison was born with hyperactive senses. During his childhood, he had a friend, Bud who helped him with said senses. Unfortunately, Bud was murdered at some point, one of many cases of trauma in his childhood. His mother also left, leaving him to live with his extremely wealthy father, William Ellison, and his brother, Steven Ellison. Jim's relationship with both characters is notably strained, and leads to both the repression of his senses and his joining the Army.

While in the Army, Jim achieves the rank of captain in the US Army Rangers/Special Forces, working covert ops. His last mission (for 7th group special forces - ODA 731) takes him and his team of seven to Peru to stop a drug-smuggling campaign. Unfortunately, his ranking officer was corrupt and set him and his men up for failure. His helicopter crashes, killing his seven men and leaving him wounded. He is taken in by the Chopec, an elusive and secretive tribe in Peru, and learns to control his senses for the tribe's betterment under the tutelage of Incacha, the tribe's shaman, who calls Jim "Enqueri" ("Sentinel"). The following year, when a satellite photo shows seven tombstones at the helicopter's crash site instead of just a pile of scrap metal, the US Army sends in a team to find the sole survivor of the crash and bring him back home.

During the series, in flashbacks of Jim's military time, his various military awards and badges were shown on his military uniform. For example, in Season 2 Episode 15 "Secrets", Jim's Silver Star medal is shown. Additionally in the pilot, Jim is shown to be wearing a Combat Infantryman Badge and the Parachutist Breast Badge on his uniform. In Season 4 Episode 4 "Dead End on Blank Street", Jim is also shown to be wearing a Combat Medic Breast Badge.

When Jim returns to Cascade, Washington, he represses the memories of his time in Peru. Nevertheless, his instincts as a Sentinel remain, leading him to "serve and protect" his "tribe", the residents of Cascade, by joining the police force. Eventually assigned to Vice, he is mentored by Jack Pendergrast, who helps Jim tame his temper and his rebellious attitude. Jim later marries Carolyn Plummer, another detective on the force. Jack then dies, and Carolyn and Jim divorce.

Shortly afterwards, Jim is sent on a solitary stakeout for a week in a remote woodland location, during which his senses start to re-emerge, primarily his sight and hearing. After his return to the city, his enhanced senses fully emerge, leaving him feeling disoriented, "stressed out" and drugged. He can see, hear, and smell things that no other person could, he can only handle the blandest of foods, and any barely-coarse materials leave him wishing to claw his skin off. He checks himself into a hospital, where he meets Blair Sandburg posing as Doctor McCoy (as it says on the stolen lab coat he wears) or Doctor McKay (as he pronounces it).

During the series, Jim falls in love with a handful of women but most of them end up dying in his arms. Several of Jim's old friends from the Army and police force also end up dead during the course of the show.

Powers
Jim's hyperacute senses allow him to perceive things undetectable by normal humans.  He can see perfectly in low light situations and with superb acuity at long distances, hear sounds at extremely low volume or beyond the normal range of human hearing, and sense what others cannot via taste, touch and smell; he declares himself "a walking forensic lab". Jim's powers have a drawback: if he concentrates too strongly on one sense, he may become oblivious to his immediate surroundings. Part of Blair's job is preventing this, and protecting Jim when he is focusing. As a Sentinel Jim has several powers:
All 5 senses are strongly enhanced
Able to communicate with ghosts
Has a spirit animal, a black jaguar
Receives visions that guide him in the choices he makes and sometimes predict the future (Jim had a vision that showed Blair's death before Alex killed him)
Used the power of his animal spirit to bring Blair back from the dead

Blair Sandburg
Blair Sandburg is the genius son of Naomi Sandburg, an absolute flower child. In his youth, he was all about free love and the hippie spirit, and has yet to stop. Blair had little to no stability in his youth, always moving from home to home and never settling, but that was also what spawned his love of anthropology.

When Blair was sixteen, he moved to Cascade, Washington to begin his studies. An anthropology major, his advisor was Eli Stoddard, a major expert in the field. As he quickly moved through his education, he took many trips on grants to various parts of the globe. When he finally decided to get his doctorate, he became a teaching fellow. The topic of his dissertation was the Sentinel. This was brought about by a monograph by Sir Richard Francis Burton that described both the sentinels and their roles in their respective tribes, and their partners, accurately named by one villain: guides.

At twenty-six, Blair has an "office" in the basement at Rainier, and an $850 a month,  warehouse apartment.

During the course of the show, Blair has several girlfriends, sometimes dating more than one woman at a time.  One of his ex-girlfriends works at Cascade General, which is how he met Jim in the first place:  she told him a man with complaints about all five of his senses had recently been admitted.

In Jim's visions, Blair's spirit animal is a grey wolf.

Cancellation
The Sentinel was canceled after 3 seasons by UPN, with the last episode being a big cliffhanger with Blair's life in the balance. An intense fan campaign convinced UPN to give the series a season of eight episodes to end the series properly.

International broadcast

Outside the United States, the series has been broadcast by the following stations under the following names:

Home media
On April 18, 2006, CBS DVD (distributed by Paramount) released "The Complete First Season" of The Sentinel on DVD in Region 1. As of 2015, this release has been discontinued and is out of print.

On May 5, 2015, it was announced that Visual Entertainment had acquired the rights to the series in Region 1 and plan to release The Sentinel on DVD before the end of calendar year 2015.

On September 1, 2015, it was announced that Visual Entertainment will release The Sentinel – The Complete Series on DVD on September 22, 2015.

References

External links
The Sentinel official site (Syfy). Archived from the original on August 11, 2003.

UPN original programming
1990s American crime drama television series
1990s American science fiction television series
1996 American television series debuts
1999 American television series endings
1990s Canadian crime drama television series
1990s Canadian science fiction television series
1996 Canadian television series debuts
1999 Canadian television series endings
Television series by CBS Studios
Television shows set in Washington, D.C.
American television series revived after cancellation
Canadian television series revived after cancellation